Isaac Towers (born 1 October 1998) is a Paralympian athlete from England competing in category T34 sprint and middle-distance events. Towers won gold to become European champion in the 800m (T34) event in 2016 and qualified for the Summer Paralympics in Rio.

Early life
Towers was born in 1998 in Lancashire, England. He was educated at Saint Michael's on Wyre Primary School and King Edward VII and Queen Mary School, before attending Cardinal Newman College where he studies business. He has cerebral palsy.

Athletics career
Towers was introduced to wheelchair athletics in 2010 after being introduced to the sport by para-athletics coach Ian Thompson. By 2011 he was classified as a T34 classification athlete and was competing at regional competitions. In 2013 he wanted to enter the World Championships in Lyon, but at 14 he was under the minimum age requirement. That year he was named as a nominee for the BBC Young Sports Personality of the Year.

In 2014 Towers entered his first IPC Grand Prix, travelling to Nottwil in Switzerland to compete in the ParAthletics meet. A month later, in June, he traveled to the United States to compete at the Indianapolis International. In August he was selected for the Great Britain team for the 2014 IPC Athletics European Championships where he entered four events, the 100m, 200m, 400m and 800m (T34) events. In the 100m and 200m, Towers qualified for the finals but did not medal. In his favoured longer distance races Towers finished third in the 400m and second in the 800m to earn his first major international medals.

At the 2015 IPC Athletics World Championships Towers raced in the 200m, 400m and 800m events. He failed to qualify for the 200m final, and finished outside the medal places in both the 400m (6th) and 800m (6th). The following year, in the buildup to the 2016 Summer Paralympics in Rio, Towers competed at the European Championships in Grosseto. He finished fourth in the 100m, but took the full sweep of medals in his other three events. He took bronze in the 200m sprint, behind Russia's Sebastien Mobre and eventual winner Henry Manni. In the 400m he won silver, again behind his main rival Manni. The 800m race saw Towers win his first major international gold medal recording a championship record of 1:44.67. More importantly it saw him beat Manni, who finished second despite posting a personal best. Following his performance in Grosseto, Towers was selected for the Great Britain athletics team for the 2016 Summer Paralympics in the 800m T34.

References 

1998 births
Living people
Sportspeople from Blackpool
Track and field athletes with cerebral palsy
English male wheelchair racers
British male wheelchair racers
Athletes (track and field) at the 2020 Summer Paralympics